Pancharevo (also transcribed as Pančarevo) is a resort village and district located on the outskirts of Sofia close to Vitosha, Lozenska and Plana mountains and occupies the southeastern part of the Capital Municipality. the village has 3,433 inhabitants, but the district has about 28,000 inhabitants. It includes the largest artificial lake in Bulgaria Lake Pancharevo, also as Iskar Reservoir and Pasarel Reservoir, located one above the other. The districts consists of 10 villages, and Pancharevo is the municipal seat:

 Bistritsa
 German
 Kazichene
 Kokalyane
 Krivina
 Lozen
 Pancharevo
 Pasarel
 Plana
 Zheleznitsa

The district offers excellent conditions for relaxation and tourism for the citizens of the capital. The large dams are used for water sports, fishing, camping and boat trips. There are many historical sights from the Middle Ages which include the ruins of the Urvich fortress which was the site of a desperate and unsuccessful battle against the Turkish invaders in the late 14th century. There are many monasteries and chapels, of which some lie in ruins since the fall of the Second Bulgarian Empire.

The village of Pancharevo is located 12 km southeast of the city center of Sofia, along Samokovsko shosse str. It lies at 700 m. above sea level between Vitosha and Lozen mountains, and at the end of the Pancharevo gorge of Iskar River. In Pancharevo Vitoshka Bistritsa River, sloping steeply from the highest parts of the mountain, flows into Lake Pancharevo.

Pancharevo has modern suburban houses for all-year living as well as gated residence areas, and has easy access to the Sofia Ring Road, Business Park Sofia, Tsarigradsko shosse, Sofia Airport, Samokov and Borovets.

History 
The Pancharevo mineral springs were probably known of the Thracians, who founded a settlement named Rilyanik, meaning abundant spring. Later the name was transformed. In Romans time  - Baths Cesare / Royal /, when they were well supported by the aristocracy and the local population, and around them formed a rich imperial estate with vineyards. Bulgarians called them "Baths Tsarevi", and the Turks - "Bandzharevi" and around them existed famous Kinan-Pashovs farm.

Pancharevo and its environs have retained significant traces of the Roman Empire. Then was a mineral bath which had seven pools. There are reasons to believe that at both the springs in Sofia and at Pancharevo has practiced the cult of the physician god Asklepios and the nymphs, as fragments of bas-reliefs of the three nymphs were found in both places. Over the bath in the area of "Gradishteto" were found the remains of Roman buildings and fortress designed to repel the barbarian invasions of the access routes from Serdica through the Iskar Gorge, in the direction of Samokov, but unfortunately no more extensive archeological studies were performed later in the area.

Pancharevo was first mentioned in the 16th-century Urvich Donation list as ПАНЧАР, ПАНЧАРЄВѠ, ПАНИЧАРЬ. Those early references allow linguists to derive its name from the noun pan(i)char, "bowl maker", itself from the noun panitsa ("bowl"). Panitsa might be a geographical term referring to a concave place.

References

Populated places in Sofia City Province
Districts of Sofia
Villages in Sofia City Province